The Night Hawk River is a river in the James Bay and Moose River drainage basins in Cochrane and Timiskaming Districts in northeastern Ontario, Canada. It flows  from Austen Lake to its mouth at Night Hawk Lake, the source of the Frederick House River, a tributary of the Abitibi River.

Course
Portions of the primary inflow of Austen Lake, the West Night Hawk River, as well as all of that river's source, West Night Hawk Lake, lie in the northeastern portion of the Unorganized, North Part of Sudbury District, Ontario, meaning that the Night Hawk River drainage basin is in three Ontario districts.

The Night Hawk River flows northeast, passes over a small dam, turns north, and takes in the left tributary Little Night Hawk River arriving from Little Night Hawk Lake. It turns northeast again, takes in the right tributary East Night Hawk River arriving from East Night Hawk Lake, heads north, and flows into the city of Timmins in Cochrane District.

Tributaries
West Night Hawk River (left)
East Night Hawk River (right)
Little Night Hawk River (left)
Esker Creek (right)
Austen Lake
Kitchiming Creek (left)
West Night Hawk River (left)
West Night Hawk Lake
Wabiasin Creek (left)

See also
List of rivers of Ontario

References

Rivers of Cochrane District
Rivers of Timiskaming District